Caracollina is a genus of gastropods belonging to the family Trissexodontidae.

The species of this genus are found in Mediterranean regions.

Species:

Caracollina barreri 
Caracollina huloti 
Caracollina lenticula

References

Trissexodontidae